The 1947 Ladies Open Championships was held at the Lansdowne Club in London from 27 January - 2 February 1947. Joan Curry won her first title defeating Alice Teague in the final.

Draw and results

First round

Second round

Third round

Quarter-finals

Semi-finals

Final

References

Women's British Open Squash Championships
Women's British Open Squash Championships
Women's British Open Squash Championships
Squash competitions in London
Women's British Open Championships
British Open Championships 
Women's British Open Squash Championships
Women's British Open Squash Championships